The Sant'Anna Hospital is the main hospital of the province of Como, Italy. It is located in San Fermo della Battaglia on via Ravona.

It is a hospital that is part of the Azienda ospedaliera Ospedale Sant'Anna di Como, that includes also:

 The Sant'Antonio Abate Hospital in Cantù
 The Erba-Renaldi Hospital in Menaggio
 The Felice Villa Hospital in Mariano Comense.

The hospital is affiliated with the School of Medicine and Surgery of the University of Insubria.

References

Bibliography 

 Giovanni Di Capua e Giovanni Ferrari, L'Ospedale Sant'Anna di Como nella storia della città.

Hospitals in Italy
Province of Como